The Bété are an Ivory Coast group with strong cultural and artistic links to the Dan, the We (Gwere) and the Guro, among others. The Bete together with many other ethnolinguistic groups makeup the Kru ethnic group. There are 93 distinct groups within the Bété polity.

Culture 
They are only united in that they are subsistence farmers, but base most of their culture around hunting. Social control was exercised by the leading member of individual lineages (several in each village) who exercises judicial and financial power within the community. 

Bété are known for their focus on individual rights. A male "chief" is chosen by the people based on the criterion of wisdom. This leader stays in power until his death or any wrongdoing. Bete women are known for being outspoken.

Religion 
Historically, spiritual authority was wielded with an array of paraphernalia, notably including the “gre” mask, a horned and decorated creation (originating with the We) designed to instill terror in the onlooker, to quell social unrest, and to be worn when meting out justice after conflict.

Statuary is uncommon, and is based around feminine iconography that refers to a mythical mother figure. No recognized liturgical function was found, although some reports indicate that a pair of figures was often placed under a village rain shelter to represent its founders. This evocation of a primeval couple has widespread resonance in African culture. Rare figures with exaggerated genitalia are probably linked to a magico-religious fertility appeal. Alternatively, they may have constituted a more general role, evoking or celebrating the fertility of the village/land, its founders or the forest from which the people made their living.

Today much of the population is Christian.

Marriage 
Traditionally, Bete men traveled outside of the village to find marriage partners. Choosing a partner within the ethnicity is not allowed because of the belief that the village is a family unit. Ethnically diverse marriages therefore are strongly encouraged. Before dating begins men ask about the woman's family to prevent an intra-familial match. Marriage is forbidden if the couple is related in any way. Husbands remain in their home village after marriage. Wives are assigned the husband's ethnic identity. The husband is expected to provide a home and land (usually inherited) for his wife. 

The marriage is discussed only among the bride and groom and is meant to be a surprise for the parents, particularly the woman's parents. The date of the wedding is set and the wife's family is invited to the groom's village to celebrate. The woman's family then visits to make sure the woman is marrying of her own free will. This is a polite formality. When she has said that she is sure of her decision, then congratulations are welcomed. The wedding ceremony takes one week. Each day is a celebration of the bride and she is treated royally.

Polygamy is practiced by wealthier and older men. Husbands typically have no more than three wives. When a man decides to marry again, the first wife becomes a sort of mother to her. The original wife may choose to become the head of the group of wives. This is a common practice but not an obligation. Any wife may choose to separate if her husband marries another woman. The original wife may attempt to make the second wife feel unwelcome to make her leave instead. Alternatively, the wives get along.

Divorce is very common. A wife can leave her husband and return to her home village whenever she chooses without notice or explanation. The husband in turn can choose to kick his wife out. Counseling among friends is very common in marital disputes.

Traditions are mostly practiced by people still living in villages. When the children move to cities, they usually adopt modern traditions.

Notable people
 Brice Dja Djédjé
 Cyril Domoraud
 Gervinho
 Hervé Guy
 Jean-Jacques Gosso
 Igor Lolo
 Koffi Kouao
 Soumahoro Bangaly
 Bonaventure Kalou
 Salomon Kalou
 Eric Bailly
 Franck Kessié
 Serge Aurier
 Maxwel Cornet
 Max Gradel
 Didier Drogba
 Johan Djourou
 Laurent Gbagbo
 Frédéric Bruly Bouabré
 Simon Adingra

See also
Bété language

References 
Bacquart, J. 1998/2000. The Tribal Arts of Africa. Thames and Hudson.

Ethnic groups in Ivory Coast